Gudem may refer to:

 Chappidolla Gudem, a village of Choutuppal mandal in the Nalgonda district in Telangana
 Gali Gudem, a village and gram panchayat in Kondurg mandal in Mahbubnagar district
 Gudem kotha veedhi, a village and a mandal in Visakhapatnam district in the state of Andhra Pradesh
 Tadepalli Gudem, a town and a municipality in Andhra Pradesh
 Gudem, a small village in Odela Mandal in Karimnagar district